Bret Lunsford (born December 12, 1962) is an American vocalist, songwriter, guitarist, and founding member of the influential band Beat Happening and D+.  In addition to his own musical endeavors, Lunsford owns and operates Knw-Yr-Own Records, an independent label based in Lunsford's hometown of Anacortes, Washington, and manages  What the Heck Fest, an annual music festival featuring independent and local musicians. He is also a writer of cultural criticism, and author of Images of America, Anacortes. From 1990 to 2005, Lunsford was the owner of The Business record store in Anacortes.

References

1962 births
People from Anacortes, Washington
Musicians from Washington (state)
Beat Happening members
K Records artists
Living people
20th-century American guitarists